Ali Ettounsi (born 1 January 1966) is a Moroccan former long-distance runner. He competed in the men's marathon at the 1996 Summer Olympics.

References

External links
 

1966 births
Living people
Athletes (track and field) at the 1996 Summer Olympics
Moroccan male long-distance runners
Moroccan male marathon runners
Olympic athletes of Morocco
Place of birth missing (living people)
Olympic male marathon runners
20th-century Moroccan people
21st-century Moroccan people